The Villela Aribu (Brazilian-Portuguese typo name for the Black vulture bird) was a Brazilian single-engine, single-seat experimental aircraft.

Design and development
It was designed by the then 1st Lieutenant of the Brazilian Army, to be a primary training and surveillance aircraft. The Aribu was a single-engine, high-wing monoplane, made of ingarana wood and canvas, with a French rotary engine and wooden propellers.

Specifications

References

External links
 Photo of the Aribu

1910s Brazilian experimental aircraft
Single-engined tractor aircraft
Monoplanes
Aircraft first flown in 1917